Rita Clermont (1894–1969) was a German film actress of the silent era.

Selected filmography
 The Uncanny House (1916)
 The Lord of Hohenstein (1917)
 Nocturne of Love (1919)
 Prostitution (1919)
 Deceiver of the People (1921)
 Dance of Passions (1922)
 Irene of Gold (1923)
 Maud Rockefeller's Bet (1924)

References

Bibliography

External links

1894 births
1969 deaths
German film actresses
German silent film actresses
20th-century German actresses
People from Regensburg